Church of the Advent, Advent Church, Cathedral of the Advent, or other variations may refer to:
Cathedral Church of the Advent (Birmingham, Alabama)
St. Clement's Chapel or St. Clement's Chapel of the Church of the Advent, Tallahassee, Florida
Episcopal Church of the Advent (Cynthiana, Kentucky)
Episcopal Church of the Advent (Louisville, Kentucky)
Church of the Advent (Limestone, Maine)
Church of the Advent (Boston)
Church of the Advent (Farmington, Minnesota)
Episcopal Church of the Advent / St. John's Chapel, Cape May, New Jersey
Advent Lutheran Church (New York City)
Episcopal Church of the Advent and Guild Hall, Devil's Lake, North Dakota
Church of the Advent (Spartanburg, South Carolina)
Brooksville Advent Church, New Haven, Vermont
First Day Advent Christian Church, Maryhill, Washington